The 1975–76 Yugoslav First Basketball League season was the 32nd season of the Yugoslav First Basketball League, the highest professional basketball league in SFR Yugoslavia.

Classification 

The winning roster of Partizan:
  Dragan Kićanović
  Dražen Dalipagić
  Josip Farčić
  Dušan Kerkez
  Branimir Popović
  Dragan Todorić
  Boris Beravs
  Goran Latifić
  Dragan Đukić
  Vojislav Višekruna
  Dušan Pavlović
  Milenko Babić
  Radenko Orlović
  Zoran Koprivica
  Miodrag Marić
  Dragan Milutinović

Coach:  Borislav Ćorković

Scoring leaders
 Dragan Kićanović (Partizan) - ___ points (31.0ppg)

Qualification in 1976-77 season European competitions 

FIBA European Champions Cup
 Partizan (champions)

FIBA Cup Winner's Cup
 Radnički Belgrade (Cup winners)

FIBA Korać Cup
 Jugoplastika (2nd)
 Bosna (3rd)

References

Yugoslav First Basketball League seasons
Yugo
Yugo